Agrochem may refer to:
Agrochemical, a chemical used in farming
Agricultural chemistry
AgroChem, Inc.
Agrochemical F.C.